Hector Macpherson Sr. (April 22, 1875 – March 28, 1970) was a Canadian–American academic and politician of Scottish descent. He was the father of Hector Macpherson Jr.

Biography
Both of Macpherson's parents were born in Scotland. By 1875, they had emigrated to Canada, where he was born. He attended schools in Canada, England, and Germany, before moving to Oregon in 1911. Macpherson taught economics and sociology ("political economy") at the Oregon Agricultural College in Corvallis until 1926. He was first elected to the state Oregon House of Representatives in 1927 and reelected in 1929. Together with Henry Zorn, Macpherson sponsored a School Moving Bill in 1932. The ballot initiative proposed consolidating Oregon State University with the University of Oregon, and moving other state-funded schools to different cities. The petition was defeated. Macpherson was elected to a final term in 1939.

References

1875 births
1970 deaths
Republican Party members of the Oregon House of Representatives
Oregon State University faculty
Canadian emigrants to the United States
Canadian people of Scottish descent
People from Dufferin County
People from Albany, Oregon
Farmers from Oregon
Canadian expatriates in the United Kingdom
Expatriates from Canada in the German Empire